Hypericum augustinii is a shrub in the genus Hypericum. Endemic to Yunnan, China, it has only been found in the far south of the province at elevations of 1200m to 1900m.

References

augustinii
Endemic flora of Yunnan